Alethea Kontis is an American writer of Teen & Young Adult Books, picture books and speculative fiction, primarily for children. She lived in Ashburn, Virginia and then in Titusville, FL.

Selected works

Novels
 Enchanted The Woodcutter Sisters Book 1 (Harcourt Books, 2012)  2012 Gelett Burgess Award Winner, 2015 Garden State Teen Book Award
 Hero The Woodcutter Sisters Book 2 (HM Harcourt, 2013)
 Dearest The Woodcutter Sisters Book 3 (HM Harcourt, 2015)
 Trixter" The Trix Adventures Book 1  (Self Published, 2015)
 Trix & the Faerie Queen The Trix Adventures Book 2   (Self Published, 2016)  2016 Dragon Award Finalist
 Haven Kansas  (Self Published, 2016)
 The Truth About Cats And Wolves: A Nocturne Falls Universe story (Sugar Skull Books, 2017)
 When Tinker Met Bell: A Nocturne Falls Universe story (Sugar Skull Books, 2017)  2018 Dragon Award Nominee
 Besphinxed: A Nocturne Falls Universe story (Sugar Skull Books, 2018)  2019 Scribe Award Winner
 Thieftess (Thursday Woodcutter) The Woodcutter Sisters Book 4 Release Date TBD
 Fated (Wednesday Woodcutter) The Woodcutter Sisters Book 5 Release Date TBD
 Endless (Tuesday Woodcutter) The Woodcutter Sisters Book 6 Release Date TBD
 Countenance (Monday Woodcutter)  The Woodcutter Sisters Book 7 Release Date TBD
 Trix and the Fire Witch The Trix Adventures Book 3 Release Date TBD

Collections
 Beauty & Dynamite (Apex Publications, June 2008)  – essays and poems
 Wild & Wishful, Dark & Dreaming: the worlds of Alethea Kontis (2013, Alliteration Ink)
 Tales of Arilland (Fairy Stories from the Dark Wood) Books of Arilland Book 5  (Self Published, 2015)  2015 Gelett Burgess Award Winner
 Genius Loci: Tales of the Spirit of Place  (Ragnarok Publications, 2016) 
 Upside Down: Inverted Tropes in Storytelling (Apex Book Company, 2016)

Non-fiction
 The Dark-Hunter Companion, co-written with Sherrilyn Kenyon (St. Martin's Griffin, 2007)  - guide to the Dark-Hunter series

Children's books
 AlphaOops!: The Day Z Went First, illustrated by Bob Kolar (Candlewick Press, 2006)
 Diary of a Mad Scientist Garden Gnome, illus. Janet K. Lee;  (Thaumatrope, 2009)
 AlphaOops!: H is for Halloween, illus. Bob Kolar, (Candlewick Press, 2010)
 The Wonderland Alphabet: Alice's Adventures Through the ABCs and What She Found There, illus. Janet K. Lee (Archaia, 2012)
 Oodles of Doodles!: Ready-to-Read Level 1, illus. Christophe Jacques, (Simon Spotlight, 2022)

Short stories
 "Sunday" (Realms of Fantasy, October 2006)
 "Small Magics" (Orson Scott Card's InterGalactic Medicine Show, October 2006)
 "Blood & Water" (Orson Scott Card's InterGalactic Medicine Show, July 2008) (Twice Upon A Time: Fairytale, Folklore, & Myth. Reimagined & Remastered, February 13, 2015, reprint)
 "Clockwise" (Orson Scott Card's InterGalactic Medicine Show, Nov. 2011)
 "Black Hole Sun" (w/Kelli Dunlap)
 "Life's a Beach" (w/Ariell Branson) 
 "Blue & Gray and Black & Green"
 "Ghost Dancer"
 "The Giant & The Unicorn"
 "Sweetheart Come"
 "The God of Last Moments"
 "Foiled"
 "Happy Thoughts" (Apex Digest issue #3)
 "Poor Man's Roses"
 "The Monster & Mrs. Blake" (for The Story Station)
 "Diary of a Ghost's Mistress" (Shroud magazine)
 "Hero Worship"
 "Pocket Full of Posey"
 "Red Lantern"
 "Savage Planet"
 "Unicorn Gold"
 "The Unicorn Hunter"
 "The Unicorn Tree"
 "The Way of the Restless"
 "The Witch of Black Mountain" 
 "Messenger (Chapter 20 of Dearest) (2015)
 "For Angels to Fly: A Short Story" (2016)
 "Barefoot Bay: Fish Out of Water (Kindle Worlds Novella)" (2016)

Anthologies edited
 Elemental: The Tsunami Relief Anthology: Stories of Science Fiction and Fantasy, co-edited with Steven Savile (Tor Books, 2006) 
 Once Upon A Curse: 17 Dark Faerie Tales'' (Fiddlehead Press, 2016) ASIN B01G35DZAW

See also
 Great grand-niece of Ernestine Mercer.

References

External links 

 
 Patreon (official)
 East/West Literary Agency
 Free reads on Wattpad
 Goodreads Author Profile (official)
 
 
 

21st-century American novelists
American children's writers
American fantasy writers
American women novelists
Living people
People from Ashburn, Virginia
American women children's writers
Women science fiction and fantasy writers
21st-century American women writers
People from Titusville, Florida
Year of birth missing (living people)